The Keddara Dam, or Barrage Keddara, is an embankment dam  northwest of Keddara on the Boudouaou River in Boumerdès Province, Algeria.

References

Dams in Algeria
Rock-filled dams
Buildings and structures in Boumerdès Province
Dams completed in 1987
Boumerdès Province